Vaughan and Violins is a 1959 album by Sarah Vaughan, orchestrated and conducted by Quincy Jones.

Reception

The AllMusic review by Dave Nathan awarded the album four and a half stars and said that "these sessions catch Sarah Vaughan at her magnificent best. There may be claims of overdoing it or garishness. But her set of pipes and her willingness to use them dramatically, and sometimes coyly, to bring out the best of everything she sings brushes aside such criticisms as unjustified. Classic standard or novelty tune, she had full command of the vocal art."

Track listing
"Please Be Kind" (Sammy Cahn, Saul Chaplin) – 3:15
"The Midnight Sun Will Never Set" (Dorcas Cochran, Quincy Jones, Henri Salvador) – 2:50
"Live for Love" (Paul Misraki, Carl Sigman) – 3:23
"Misty" (Johnny Burke, Erroll Garner) – 3:02
"I'm Lost" (Otis René) – 3:40
"Love Me" (John Lehmann, John Lewis) – 3:12
"That's All" (Alan Brandt, Bob Haymes) – 3:31
"Day by Day" (Sammy Cahn, Axel Stordahl, Paul Weston) – 3:10
"Gone with the Wind" (Herbert Magidson, Allie Wrubel) – 3:28
"I'll Close My Eyes" (Buddy Kaye, Billy Reid) – 3:40
"The Thrill Is Gone" (Lew Brown, Ray Henderson) – 2:28

Personnel 
 Sarah Vaughan – vocals
 Quincy Jones – arranger, conductor
 Zoot Sims – saxophone
 Ronnell Bright – piano
 Richard Davis – bass
 Pierre Michelot – bass
 Kenny Clarke – drums

Source:

References

1959 albums
Sarah Vaughan albums
Mercury Records albums
Albums arranged by Quincy Jones
Albums conducted by Quincy Jones